Eamonn Fitzgerald (27 October 1903 – 9 June 1958) was an Irish athlete. He competed in the men's triple jump at the 1932 Summer Olympics.

References

External links
 

1903 births
1958 deaths
Athletes (track and field) at the 1932 Summer Olympics
Irish male triple jumpers
Olympic athletes of Ireland
Place of birth missing
Kerry inter-county Gaelic footballers